Real Salt Lake is an American soccer club founded in 2005, currently playing in the Western Conference of Major League Soccer. It currently plays its home games at Rio Tinto Stadium in Sandy, Utah, a suburb of Salt Lake City. Since founding, the club won MLS Cup 2009, and finished as runner-up for the 2010 MLS Supporters Shield, the 2010-11 CONCACAF Champions League, the 2013 Lamar Hunt U.S. Open Cup, and MLS Cup 2013.

As of November 5, 2016, a total of 119 players have participated in at least one league match for Real Salt Lake. American goalkeeper Nick Rimando holds the club record for both shutouts and total regular season appearances, with 93 shutouts and 279 appearances, respectively. The club's all-time top scorer is Costa Rican international Álvaro Saborío, with 63 goals in 127 regular season appearances with the club. The club record for assists is held by Argentine Javier Morales, with 81 assists in 240 regular season appearances.

Players

Outfield Players
These players have appeared in at least one match for Real Salt Lake.

Competitive matches only. Players in bold are currently on the team roster.

Goalkeepers
These players have appeared in at least one match for Real Salt Lake.

Competitive matches only. Players in bold are currently on the team roster.

Other Players
Players listed below have not appeared in a competitive match for Real Salt Lake, but are currently under contract by the club.

By nationality

Real Salt Lake
 
Association football player non-biographical articles